Wyoming Highway 434 (WYO 434) is a  Wyoming state road in Washakie county.

Route description
Wyoming Highway 434 begins its southern end in an area called Big Trails, 20 miles south of Ten Sleep, at Washakie CR 82. Highway 434 proceeds north from here to the Town of Ten Sleep where it reaches its northern terminus at US Route 16 (2nd Street).

Major intersections

References

External links 

Wyoming State Routes 400-499
WYO 434 - US 16 to Washakie CR 82

Transportation in Washakie County, Wyoming
434